Eyewitness is an American crime thriller drama television series that premiered on USA Network on October 16, 2016. An adaptation of the 2014 Norwegian miniseries of the same name, the series stars Tyler Young and James Paxton as two teenage boys who accidentally witness a triple murder. It also stars Julianne Nicholson, Gil Bellows, Warren Christie, and Tattiawna Jones.

Cast and characters

Main

 Julianne Nicholson as Helen Torrance, a sheriff
 Tyler Young as Philip Shea
 James Paxton as Lukas Waldenbeck
 Gil Bellows as Gabe Caldwell, a veterinarian, and Helen's husband
 Warren Christie as Ryan Kane
 Tattiawna Jones as Kamilah Davis, an FBI agent

Recurring
 Amanda Brugel as Sita Petronelli, Kamilah's sister
 Aidan Devine as Bo Waldenbeck, Lukas' father
 Rainbow Sun Francks as Burlingame, Kamilah's partner
 Matt Murray as Tony Michaels, a deputy
 Katie Douglas as Bella Milonkovic
 Mercedes Morris as Rose, Lukas' ex-girlfriend
 Carlyn Burchell as Anne Shea, Philip's mother
 Alex Karzis as Mithat Milonkovic
 Adrian Fritsch as Tommy

Episodes

Production
Principal photography commenced on April 25, 2016 and wrapped on August 8, 2016. The majority of filming took place in Parry Sound, Ontario. Filming also took place in McKellar, Rosseau, Seguin, Magnetawan, and Bracebridge.

On March 1, 2017, USA Network confirmed the series would be canceled because it did not hold as much of the Law & Order: Special Victims Unit audience as the network had hoped.

Reception

Critical response
Eyewitness received positive to mixed reviews. On review aggregator website Rotten Tomatoes, the series has a 83% "certified fresh" rating based on 12 critics. On Metacritic, it has a weighted average score of 58 out of 100, based on 11 critics.

Ratings
In Nielsen's Live+Same Day ratings, the miniseries attained a 0.17 in the 18-49 demographic and 639,000 total viewers.

Awards and nominations

References

External links
 
 

2016 American television series debuts
2016 American television series endings
2010s American crime drama television series
2010s American drama television series
2010s American LGBT-related drama television series
2010s American mystery television series
American television series based on Norwegian television series
American thriller television series
Crime thriller television series
English-language television shows
Gay-related television shows
Television series by Universal Content Productions
Television shows filmed in Ontario
Television shows about murder
USA Network original programming